Tarryall Creek is a tributary of the South Platte River, approximately  long, in Park County in central Colorado in the United States. It drains a rural portion of north and central South Park, an intermontane grassland in the Rocky Mountains southwest of Denver. It rises in the high Rockies in several forks along the Continental Divide in the Pike National Forest southwest of Boreas Pass. It descends to the southwest through a short canyon, emerging into South Park near Como, Colorado. It crosses U.S. Highway 285 east of Red Hill Pass northeast of Fairplay, the county seat of Park County, then meanders towards the southeast, joining the South Platte from the east in the southeastern corner of South Park.

The creek was one of the most active locations for the prospecting of gold during the Colorado Gold Rush in 1859. The "Tarryall diggings" and other nearby sites on the west side of South Park attracted thousands of prospectors over Ute Pass and Kenosha Pass, and the towns of Tarryall and Hamilton, both now completely vanished, were soon founded along the creek.  There are no towns on the upper creek today.

See also
List of rivers of Colorado

References

Rivers of Colorado
Colorado Mining Boom
Rivers of Park County, Colorado
Tributaries of the Platte River